Uncomfortable Silence is the third solo EP by American musician Clint Lowery (under the name Hello Demons...Meet Skeletons), released on August 22, 2011.

Track listing

Personnel
 Clint Lowery - Vocals, Guitar, Bass, Drums, Producer
 Corey Lowery - Mixing

References

External links
Official Clint Lowery Website

2011 EPs
Clint Lowery albums
Hard rock EPs